Clivina sabulosa is a species of ground beetle in the subfamily Scaritinae. It was described by W.S.Macleay in 1825.

References

sabulosa
Beetles described in 1825